Neoplea striola is a species of pygmy backswimmer in the family Pleidae. It is found in Central America and North America.

References

Pleidae
Articles created by Qbugbot
Insects described in 1844